Jraif is a town in central-northwestern Mauritania. It is located in the Chinguetti Department in the Adrar Region.

Nearby towns and villages include Benibafat (19.2 nm), Néma (8.0 nm), Puits des Boradda (31.6 nm),  Amerj Arr (23.5 nm) and Kataouane (35.4 nm).

External links
Satellite map at Maplandia.com

Populated places in Mauritania
Adrar Region